is a Japanese politician of the Constitutional Democratic Party and a member of the House of Councillors in the Diet (national legislature) representing the Kanagawa at-large district.

Makiyama graduated International Christian University in 1987 and briefly worked at Tokyo Broadcasting System before moving to the United States to attend the Thomas M. Cooley Law School. She was admitted to the bar in New York and Connecticut and practiced at the New York law firm of Marks & Murase (later Bingham Dana).

She entered politics by running in the 2005 general election for the House of Representatives, in which she was defeated by former foreign minister Yoriko Kawaguchi. She was elected for the first time in the 2007 House of Councillors election. When the Democratic Party merged with the Party of Hope in May 2018 to form the Democratic Party for the People, Makiyama did not join the new party and decided to join the CDP instead.

References 

1964 births
Living people
Connecticut lawyers
Constitutional Democratic Party of Japan politicians
Democratic Party of Japan politicians
Female members of the House of Councillors (Japan)
Members of the House of Councillors (Japan)
New York (state) lawyers